is the tenth installment in the Super Sentai metaseries produced by Toei Company. It was broadcast on TV Asahi from March 1, 1986, to February 21, 1987 , replacing Dengeki Sentai Changeman and was replaced by Hikari Sentai Maskman with 50 episodes. It was the first Sentai series that introduced a second giant robot, Titan Boy.

Yutaka Izubuchi designed all the characters in the series. He would return to design characters for Tokumei Sentai Go-Busters.

Storyline
In 1966, five infant children were kidnapped by an alien group known as the Alien Hunters for the Reconstructive Experiment Empire Mess, who wanted samples of humans from Earth to experiment on. The children were rescued by Mess' arch enemy, the Flash alien race, which took each one to a different planet of the Flash solar system for training. Each child was trained separately in a range of superpowers that will allow them to fight Mess, their bodies also adapted to the atmosphere of the Flash Solar System making them gain special abilities. When they finally return to Earth in 1986 to combat Mess, who is now trying to invade it, they use the opportunity to search for their birth parents.

Characters

Flashmen
Raised in the harsh conditions of Planet Flash and its four moons, gaining powers in the Flash Star System, the Flashmen were brought up for the purpose of defeating Mess. The team can execute team attacks like the Combination Super Spear, a large energy spear created from the combined powers of the Flashmen.

/: He learned science on the desert planet Flash Star, gaining scientific mental powers and scientific knowledge including a wealth of knowledge dealing with machinery. Kidnapped from Earth at age 3, given a scar by an Alien Hunter in the process. Since he was the oldest of the five kidnapped, his memories about the kidnapping are the strongest, although still fuzzy. He is the strongest of the team and as eldest, takes an older brother-like role, making him a strong leader. Red Flash would reappear again 15 years after the series ending in Gaoranger VS Super Sentai along with his 23 fellow Red Warriors led by Red Falcon, in which all 24 Red leaders performed their respective role calls.
Weapons: , 
Attacks: , 
/: He gained great strength training on the rocky Green Star, enduring the most physical pain compared to his teammates. He made friends with boxer Ryuu Wakakusa, who further trained him in his boxing abilities. He arms himself with brass knuckles. Although he has a cold exterior, he is actually a very warm and charming person. He has a weak spot for women, loves nature and ramen. He befriended the teenage Sumire, who had actually died some years back and had been contacting Dai through telepathy.
Weapons: , 
Attacks: , Upside Down Kick, 
/: He gained speed and agility on the deserts of the Blue Star planet. He learned survival skills on the harsh planet of Blue Star, such as surviving 30 days on one cup of water and how to climb walls. He is sarcastic. As the youngest member of the team, he yearns most to find his parents.
Attacks: , 
/: She developed a sharp mind on the ice planet Yellow Star, often seen as cold and serious herself by most people. However, she is actually a caring person. She is able to analyze the attacks and strategies of the villains. In the series finale, Sara learns that she is the biological daughter of Doctor Tokimura.
/: She developed incredible jumping abilities on high gravity planet Pink Star. She possesses immense physical strength, which causes her to easily exhaust herself. She once mothered a Beast Warrior.

Arsenal
: The transformation device of the Flashman. They transform by simply announcing the name of this Changer. When the suit has been formed, a transforming Flashman announces  to close the visors.
: The sidearms of the team. They can be used as laser guns or separated into swords and shields, used in their Combination Cross Boomerang attack.
: The finishing cannon of the team, assembled from the five Vul weapons. When used, Yellow Flash first targets the enemy, then the vulcans begin to rapidly rotate and the shot is fire. In episode 32 it received a power up when the prisms of the Flashmans were upgraded.

Vehicles
: The motorcycles of the team.
: A box-like base capable of space travel. It brought the Flashmen to Earth.
: A plane-like flying fortress that carries the components of the Flash King.

Mecha
: Flashman's giant robot that is formed when the command  is given. It was temporarily destroyed in episode 15 when the monster The Zukonda caught it in a suicidal attack. It returned in episode 20 after the Titan Boy was defeated by the monster The Bluezass.
: Red Flash's mecha. It is usually on the ground but flies for the formation of the Flash King to form its main body. It is stored in the front of the Star Condor. It is known as Tank Command 1 in the toy. It appeared again in Gaoranger Vs Super Sentai in the fight against Rakushaasa.
: The fighter jet of Green Flash and Yellow Flash. It forms the right limbs of the Flash King. It is stored in the rear of the Star Condor, to the right of the Jet Seeker. It is known as Jet Delta 2 in the toy.
: The AWACS jet of Blue Flash and Pink Flash with a radar that allows it to track down any alien signals. It forms the left limbs of the Flash King. It is stored in the rear of the Star Condor, to the left of the Jet Delta. It is known as Jet Seeker 3 in the toy.
: A tractor-trailer secondary mecha for the Flashman, able to convert into an airship mode. 
: The humanoid robot-shaped transformation of the Flash Titan's tractor section when the command "Flash Turn! Titan Boy!" is given.
: The combination of the Titan Boy with the Flash Titan's trailer unit when the command "Flash Turn! Great Titan!" is announced. It destroys monsters with the  finishing attack.

Allies
: A robot programmed by the aliens of the Flash Star to guard the Round Base from intruders. After being subdued by the Flashmen, Mag is reprogramed to assist them. He upgrades the prisms in their helmets to give them stronger prism weapons when the Mess officers power up, Mag can also pilot the Star Condor as seen in an episode where Jin Needs parts for his Flash Hawk.
: A scientist and family man who lost one of his children 20 years to the Alien Hunters. Because the Alien Hunters blurred his memories of the event, he has created a time machine in order to return to that time to find out more information regarding the events. He helps the Flashman with his inventions. In the series finale, he discovers that Sara is his daughter.
: The wife of Doctor Tokimura, who is also Sara's mother.
: A legendary warrior of the Flash Stars. He is the one who the Flash aliens based their Flashman technology and mecha after. He was an honorable soldier who tracked down Mess from planet to planet in order to stop them. As a result of his travels away from the Flash system, he developed the Anti-Flash Phenomenon and died while in battle with Baraki.
: The first creation of Lie Köpflen. He fought with Hero Titan and was saved by him; in awe of the legendary warrior's courage and honor, decided to defect from Mess and promised the dying Titan that he would deliver the Flash Titan when it was needed. Therefore, he fell into a slumber aboard the Flash Titan, who followed the Star Condor when it arrived to Earth, lying dormant until it was needed. He was killed by Kaura and the monster The Drake. In his dying breath, he tries to warn the Flashmen about a weak point of theirs that shall be their downfall, but expires before succeeding.

Reconstructive Experiment Empire Mess
The  takes over planets, using their lifeforms as raw materials in its experiments. Their goal is to transform its leader Ra Deus into the strongest being in the universe through repeated bio-augmentation. Their base of operations is the UFO-like spaceship called Labo. 
 (1-49): The leader of the Reconstructive Experiment Empire Mess who sought to become the ultimate life form. To fulfill that end, he recruited several Great Doctor's over the Eons, some he abducted like Doctor Köpflen. As a result, he has undergone several reconstructive operations in those years. He could fire energy shots from his fingers to punish his officers. Before the finale, after Kaura and Gardan dismantled Ra Deus, Ra Deus was transformed by Köpflen into the monster The Deusula. After being destroyed by the Flashman, his broken mask was taken by Köpflen in order to extract its DNA and fuse it with Kragen for his final creation, The Demoss, which is put down by Great Titan. A big, immobile character, he is actually portrayed by a tall puppet-like mannequin.
: The right-hand man of Deus and creator of the empire's Beast Warriors by using a keyboard-like device called DNA Synthesizer. The centuries gave Köpflen a god complex as he turned his back on Lah Deus to become the ruler of Mess. Köpflen does not know that he is actually an Earthling just like the Flashmen and was abducted 300 years ago as a baby by Deus, who later trained him in genetics. In the final episode, he offers the Flashman a chance to operate on them to repair their Anti-Flash Phenomenon in exchange for his life in the finale. After their refusal and the destruction of DNA, Synthesizer Köpflen dies in Labo's explosion. 
 (1-47): A winged, zebra-like swordsman full of pride and overconfidence. He believes himself to be superior but is disgusted once he learns from Köpflen that he was a composite being created from five grotesque and ordinary creatures. Later powered up as the monster Wandarla, in which he possessed the power to stop time for exactly 3 seconds. By combining his powers with a Beast Warrior he could stop time in an area for an indefinite amount of time. He challenged Red Flash to a final duel to prove his strength after losing his power and was eventually destroyed.
: A cunning and cruel leopard-like loyal soldier, Näfel was among the first creations of Köpflen and in the final episode calls him "father". She had a talent for disguise and often caught members of Flashman off guard this way in order to attack them. She was later powered up to be able to transform into the monster Näfelura. She was stabbed to death by Red Flash while protecting Köpflen in the finale.
 (1-28): A big and strong commander made up of genes of wild beasts. This monster does not talk but roars a lot while fighting the Flashman. He receives a power-up in Episode 28 but is destroyed by the Flash King. 
 (1-45): The assistants of Näfel which are derived from a wolf and a cat. In Episode 45 Kilt was transformed by Keflen into Deus Beast Warrior The Kiltos and was nearly killed by the Flashmen. To save her, Wolk decided to let herself be absorbed by her partner, however, their unified form was ultimately destroyed by the Great Titan. 
: They are a gang of bounty hunters who worked most for Mess in rounding up lifeforms for them to experiment on.
 (15-49): The leader of the Alien Hunters, He was the one who kidnapped the five infants who grew up into the Flashman team. He rebels once Mess keeps considering him an outsider, despite the success he has brought them. Red Flash severely wounded him in a fatal exchange of blows in Episode 48. After letting Sara discover the truth about her parents, Kaura decides to perform a kamikaze attack on Labo to kill Köpflen, but fails and ultimately dies in his UFO's explosion. 
 (43-48): The assistant leader of the Alien Hunters. He is armed with a pair of steel sticks. He was involuntarily mutated by Köpflen into the monster The Gardess.
 (15-43): An Alien Hunter armed with a laser gun, was eaten alive by the monster The Gitan.
 (15-44): An Alien Hunter armed with a huge scythe.
 (15-44): Armed with a bow and arrow, she was the sole female Alien Hunter. She was able to emit damaging beams from her eyes.
 (15-44): An Alien Hunter armed with a pair of boomerangs. He was also able to grapple opponents and electrocute them.
: The mass-produced foot soldiers of Mess, green-eyed, red-carapaced insectoid battle-troopers. They sprayed acidic strings from their mouths, which caused victims to disappear. (Since the word "Zolo" is Nihongo, the plural form is the same as the singular).
: A giant monster created from jellyfish DNA that enlarges the Beast Warriors by energy transfer, shrinking itself in the process. Its name comes from the Japanese word for jellyfish - kurage (海月).

Episodes

Movies
Choushinsei Flashman (theatrical short released the same day as episode 3)
Flashman: Big Rally! Titan Boy! (theatrical edit of episodes 15-18)

International broadcasts
The series was broadcast in Brazil under the title Comando Estelar Flashman (Star Commando Flashman) in Rede Manchete. It was broadcast in Ecuador on Ecuavisa, in Peru on Panamericana Televisión and it was broadcast several times over many years in Bolivia on RTP. The dub in Spanish was made by Alamo, the same company which made the Portuguese dub, and it was named Comando Estelar Flashman, as in Brazil.
It was also broadcast in South Korea as Earth Protector Flashman (지구방위대 후뢰시맨, Jigu Bangwidae Hureoshimaen) from 1989 to 1990 and it was the very first Super Sentai series to air in the country with a Korean dub and it was a huge hit.
The series was also broadcast in Thailand on Channel 7. Flashman was also aired in the Philippines on ABS-CBN from 1989 to 1990.
The series was broadcast in France on TF1 as simply just Flashman and despite that they have dubbed all 50 episodes, only the first 21 episodes were aired as Hikari Sentai Maskman (Being aired as Bioman 2 : Maskman) was being broadcast at the same time as this series on the same channel, bringing in fierce competition. 
It was aired in Malaysia as also just Flashman on TV3 in 1989 in English and dubbed in Malay on TV2 Malaysia Channel in 1994.
In Taiwan, the series aired with a Mandarin Chinese dub and aired in 1996 through 1997 on the Shouhua Cartoon Station, with all episodes dubbed.
In Indonesia, the series aired on RCTI in 1996 and dubbed in Indonesia. Unfortunately, the series is not finish to succeed all episodes.

Appearances in Power Rangers
The Flashman team appeared in Power Rangers Megaforce as the Prism Rangers.

Cast
 Jin: Touta Tarumi
 Dai: Kihachirō Uemura
 Bun: Yasuhiro Ishiwata
 Sara: Youko Nakamura
 Lou: Mayumi Yoshida
 Doctor Tokimura: Akira Ishihama
 Setsuko Tokimura: Tamie Kubota
 Great Doctor Lie Köphlen: Koji Shimizu
 Leh Wanda: Yutaka Hirose (credited as Kazuhisa Harose)
 Leh Näfel: Sayoko Hagiwara
 Leh Gals: Hiroyuki Uchida
 Wolk: Miyuki Nagato
 Kilt: Yuko Kojima
 Sir Kaura: Jouji Nakata
 Hero Titan: Yoshinori Okamoto
 Bo Gardan: Yoshinori Okamoto (Episode 43-48)
 Narrator: Eiichi Onoda

Voice actors
 Great Emperor Ra Deus: Unshō Ishizuka
 Mag: Hiroko Maruyama

Guest Stars
 Miran: Kazuoki Takahashi (credited as Kenji Kawai) (Episode 21)
 Ryuu Wakakusa: Ryousuke Kaizu (Episode 27)
 Sibelle: Mina Asami (Episode 40)

Songs
 Opening Theme
 
 Lyrics: 
 Composition: 
 Arrangement: 
 Artist: 

 Ending theme 
 
 Lyrics: 
 Composition: Yukihide Takekawa
 Arrangement: Keiichi Oku
 Artist: Taku Kitahara
 Episode 50 has a special ending where credits roll like the end credits with a last scene special BGM, followed by a special preview of Maskman.

References

External links
 Official Choushinsei Flashman website 

Super Sentai
Extraterrestrial superheroes
1986 Japanese television series debuts
1987 Japanese television series endings
TV Asahi original programming
1980s Japanese television series